Stratford Northwestern Secondary School was a Public High School and Middle School in Stratford, Ontario, Canada.

In 2020, students from Stratford Central Secondary School were moved to Stratford Northwestern Secondary School, and the school was renamed Stratford District Secondary School.

General info
Stratford Northwestern Secondary opened in 1963. Its 50th anniversary celebrations were held May 17–19, 2013.

In September 2003, following the closure of Juliet Public School and King Lear Public School, Grade 7 and 8 students began attending the newly formed Stratford Northwestern Public School.

The school curriculum included unique courses such as cosmetology, horticulture and culinary classes. 
The culinary class operates an in-school restaurant called The Screaming Avocado, which opened in 2004, where gourmet foods are prepared and served by students as a healthy, balanced alternative to the cafeteria food offered. The Screaming Avocado grows many of its own ingredients in the school's courtyard and greenhouse. The concept has been cited as a potential model for healthier school food practices at other schools. 
Food Network Canada featured a 13-episode series in 2007 called Fink which followed the adventures of the Northwestern Culinary Club's trip to Italy.

Northwestern was the host school for iCASE, the International Canadian Academy of Sports Excellence offering a combined academic and baseball training program.

Five Specialist High Skills Majors courses were offered: Health & Wellness, Energy, Transportation, Manufacturing and Hospitality & Tourism.

Students at Northwestern could take a full range of courses to prepare for university, college, apprenticeship and the workforce immediately upon graduation.

In 2014, Northwestern had an enrollment of 1,150 students in grades 7-12.  Extra-curricular activities included a wide range of athletics and clubs including Me To We, Fly Fishing Club, Concert Band, Drama Club, E-Team and Huskies Baseball in the spring.

Library
The school shared a library with St. Michael Secondary School. It opened in 1993 as part of the Stratford Education Recreation Centre (S.E.R.C.), and is therefore called the SERC Library.

Alumni
 Justin Bieber attended grades 7 & 8 at Stratford Northwestern.

See also
List of high schools in Ontario

References

External links
Stratford Northwestern Secondary School (copy archived July 17, 2019)

High schools in Stratford, Ontario
Educational institutions established in 1963
Educational institutions disestablished in 2019
1963 establishments in Ontario
2019 disestablishments in Ontario